Sostratus of Cnidus (born 3rd century BC), was a Greek architect and engineer. He is said to have designed the lighthouse of Alexandria, one of the Seven Wonders of the Ancient World (c. 280 BC), on the island of Pharos off Alexandria, Egypt.  This claim is disputed.

Strabo writes that the lighthouse was dedicated and presumably funded by Sostratus, a friend of Egypt's ruler, Ptolemy. Pliny says that Sostratus was the architect and that Ptolemy graciously allowed him to "sign" the monument.

References

External links
Sostratus of Cnidus bio from the Technology Museum of Thessaloniki

3rd-century BC Greek people
3rd-century BC architects
Ancient Greek architects
Lighthouse builders
Ancient Cnidians
Hellenistic engineers
Ptolemaic court
Lighthouse of Alexandria
People from Muğla Province